Kevin Orendorz  (born February 24, 1995) is a German professional ice hockey player. He is currently an unrestricted free agent who most recently played with Krefeld Pinguine of the German Deutsche Eishockey Liga.

Playing career
Orendorz made his Deutsche Eishockey Liga debut playing with Krefeld Pinguine during the 2012–13 DEL season. After spending his first six professional seasons under contract with Krefeld Pinguine, Orendorz left as a free agent following the 2017–18 campaign.

References

External links

1995 births
Living people
Fischtown Pinguins players
German ice hockey forwards
Krefeld Pinguine players
People from Iserlohn
Sportspeople from Arnsberg (region)